Peter Marshall (born 4 April 1963) is a New Zealand former cricketer. He played five first-class matches for Otago in 1991/92.

See also
 List of Otago representative cricketers

References

External links
 

1963 births
Living people
New Zealand cricketers
Otago cricketers
People from Gore, New Zealand